Bart Muys (born 1963) is a Belgian professor of forest ecology and forest management at the KU Leuven. His research focuses on the ecosystem functioning of tree diversity, the ecology of forest restoration and the evaluation of sustainability in forests and bioenergy systems. He is one of the most cited scientists internationally in the field of silviculture and forest management.

Biography
He obtained a PhD from Ghent University in 1993 on research about earthworms and litter decomposition in Flemish forests. He was director of the Royal Institute for the Sustainable Management of Natural Resources and the Promotion of Clean Technology (KINT-IRGT) from 1995 to 1997. 
He is professor of forest ecology and forest management at KU Leuven since 1997.

Research
The research group of Muys is one of the world's leading research groups in the field of Jatropha curcas.
In addition to research into the ecology of jatropha, he also investigated the potential (and sustainability) of jatropha as a biofuel. His research shows that jatropha mainly has (sustainable) potential as a smaller-scale energy source, on locations where there are few alternative energy sources or in places with degraded land.

Muys also conducts research into sustainable forest management. He compared and evaluated, for example, the sustainability of different types of forest management  and also conducted research into the (local) cooling effect of forests. For example, he was co-author in one of the most highly cited scientific papers in the high impact journal Global Environmental Change. This paper, called Trees, forests and water: Cool insights for a hot world, gives an overview of the important effects of trees on helping to retain water on the ground and to produce cooling moisture, which in turn has a positive impact on food security and climate change adaptation. Muys also demonstrated that the surface temperature can be used to monitor the restoration of degraded tropical forests. In addition to research on forest restoration, he also led several projects on forest restoration in the tropics.

Muys' observations on earthworms contributed in 2019 to an article in Science on the global distribution of earthworm biodiversity.

Books 
 Den Ouden, J., Muys, B., Mohren, G. M. J., & Verheyen, K. (2010), Bosecologie en bosbeheer, Uitgeverij Acco, 
 Heil, G.W., Muys, B. & Hansen, K. (2007) Environmental Effects of Afforestation in North-Western Europe: From Field Observations to Decision Support, Springer Publ., Series Plant and Vegetation Vol. 1, 325p.

References

External links

Living people
1963 births
Forestry academics
Forestry researchers
20th-century Belgian engineers
21st-century Belgian engineers
Ghent University alumni
Academic staff of KU Leuven